Comanche Peak Nuclear Power Plant is located in Somervell County, Texas. It relies on nearby Squaw Creek Reservoir for cooling water. The plant has about 1,300 employees and is operated by Luminant Generation, a subsidiary of Vistra Corp.

The Engineer of Record is Gibbs & Hill, Inc. of New York, New York.

Construction of the two Westinghouse pressurized water reactors began in 1974. Unit 1, originally rated at 1,084 MWe, came online on April 17, 1990. Its current, 40-year operating license is valid until February 8, 2030. Unit 2, 1,124 MWe, followed on April 6, 1993 and is licensed to operate until February 2, 2033 when it has to renew its license.  Unit 2 was the third-to-last power reactor to come online in the United States, followed only by Units 1 and 2 of Watts Bar Nuclear Generating Station.

In June 2008, the U.S. Nuclear Regulatory Commission (NRC) approved a request to increase the generating capacity of Units 1 and 2 by approximately 4.5% each. Luminant Generation Co. implemented the changes during refueling outages. Unit 1 was uprated in autumn 2008 with a capacity increase of approximately 1,210 to 1,259 MWe and Unit 2, the capacity of which rose from an estimated 1,208 to 1,245 MWe, was uprated in autumn 2009.

Proposed units 3 and 4 
On September 19, 2008, Luminant filed an application with the NRC for a Combined Construction and Operating License (COL) for two new reactors. The reactor design selected is the US version of the 1,700 MWe Advanced Pressurized Water Reactor (US-APWR), developed by Mitsubishi Heavy Industries (MHI). The project is a joint venture, with Luminant owning 88 percent and 12 percent owned by MHI. Luminant did not release an estimate of the project's cost, but CEO David Campbell said Luminant would try to build its new reactors at the low end of current industry estimates, which he said range from $2,500 to $6,000 a kilowatt — $8.5 billion to $20.4 billion for a 3,400 MW plant.

Some environmental and anti-nuclear organizations and individuals opposed the plant expansion, citing environmental, public safety and cost concerns. These included the Sustainable Energy and Economic Development Coalition, Public Citizen and state representative Lon Burnam.

, expansion had been suspended due a natural gas boom dramatically lowering power prices in Texas, and Mitsubishi Heavy Industries suspending development of its reactor design to focus on restarting its reactors in Japan. The Texas power generation company did not withdraw its application to the NRC entirely, leaving open the possibility that it might eventually expand.

Electricity Production 
Comanche Peak generated 19,356 GWh in 2021.

Surrounding population

The 2010 U.S. population within  of Comanche Peak was 30,653, an increase of 44.1 percent in a decade, according to an analysis of U.S. Census data for msnbc.com. The 2010 U.S. population within  was 1,755,528, an increase of 22.9 percent since 2000. Cities within 50 miles include Fort Worth (41 miles to city center).

Seismic risk
The Nuclear Regulatory Commission's estimate of the risk each year of an earthquake intense enough to cause core damage to the reactor at Comanche Peak was 1 in 250,000, according to an NRC study published in August 2010.

Reactor data 
The Comanche Peak Nuclear Power Plant consists of two operational reactors, two additional units are planned.

See also

List of largest power stations in the United States

Notes

References

External links 

Energy infrastructure completed in 1980
Energy infrastructure completed in 1993
Nuclear power plants in Texas
Buildings and structures in Somervell County, Texas
Nuclear power stations with proposed reactors
Nuclear power stations using pressurized water reactors
1980 establishments in Texas
Vistra Corp